Campbell Addy (born c.1993) is a London based photographer, filmmaker and artist raised in South London. His work is a celebration of the beauty and intricacy of visibility, with a focus on distinctive casting and under-represented faces.

Education 
In 2010 was when Addy discovered that he wanted to be a photographer. In detention and tasked with reorganising the school library, he discovered the books of Nick Knight, Norman Parkinson and Irving Penn and realised that the possibility of using photography in an artistic storytelling way.

Campbell Addy studied Fashion Communications at Central Saint Martins, where he realised he wanted to be a photographer after an encouraging conversation with friend Ib Kamara. In the final year of his degree he launched his own magazine and agency Nii Journal and Nii Agency. These sibling businesses were born from a desire to shift the balance of power both in front of and behind the camera, cultivating space for more diverse and representative community to be built.

Career 
Campbell Addy has worked with a number of high profile fashion clients including Off-White, Calvin Klein, MAC. He has shot magazine covers for WSJ, Time, The Cut, Dazed and Rolling Stone, and photographed cultural icons such as Tyler, the Creator, FKA Twigs, Naomi Campbell, Beyonce, and Edward Enninful.

Addy’s work has been exhibited internationally in London, Paris, Melbourne, New York, Oslo, and Qatar, being part of exhibitions such as The New Black Vanguard at the Saatchi, Get Up Stand Up Now! At Somerset House and MAJOR at 180 the Strand.

Addy was included in Forbes 30 under 30, and the New Wave British Fashion Awards in both 2018 and 2019.

His first monograph Feeling Seen: the Photographs of Campbell Addy debuted in 2022.

Exhibitions 

 New School Represents: MAJOR @ 180 the Strand, 2022
 Campbell Addy: The British Fashion Council x British Embassy exhibition, Paris, 2022
 Haute Photographie @Amsterdam Museumsquare, 2022
 The New Black Vanguard @ Saatchi Gallery, 2022
 Feeling Seen @ Protein studios, London, 2022 
 The New Black Vanguard w/ Aperture @ The Rencontres D’Arles, 2021
 The New Black Vanguard w/ Aperture @ Tasweer Photo Festival Qatar, 2021
 The New Black Vanguard w/ Aperture @ Bunjil Place Gallery Australia, 2020
 The Het Nieuwe Instituut in Rotterdam, 2019 - 2020
 Somerset House: Get Up Stand Up Now! 2019
 Matthew 7:7 & 8, 2017

Publications 

 Feeling Seen: The Photographs of Campbell Addy, 2022
 Niijournal III, 2018
 Unlocking Seoul, 2017
 Niijournal II, 2017
 Niijournal I, 2016

Awards and recognitions 

 Forbes 30 Under 30 (2021)
 The Agent’s Club Awards (2020)
 Nowness Awards (2019)
 Lovie Awards (2019)
 The British Fashion Awards: New Wave Creatives (2018 & 2019)
 Creative Review - Zeitgeist Award (2017, 2018)
 Africa Media Works Photography Prize (2018)
 Stacks Best Magazine of the Year Award (2017)
 Dazed 100 (2017)
 British Fashion Awards: New Wave Creative, (2018, 2019)
 Nowness Award (2019)
 Forbes 30 Under 30 (2021)

References 

1990s births
Living people
Year of birth missing (living people)
Ghanaian photographers
Ghanaian filmmakers
British photographers
British filmmakers
British LGBT photographers